Harold Wilberforce Hindmarsh Stephen (1841 – 30 November 1889) was an Australian politician.

He was born at Penzance in Cornwall to land speculator George Milner Stephen, who would later act as Governor of South Australia, and Mary Hindmarsh, daughter of Rear Admiral Sir John Hindmarsh, South Australia's first governor. He was educated in Melbourne and in Germany. A journalist, he edited two short-lived publications of his own, the Athenaeum and the Critic, and was briefly editor of the Sydney Punch. His family was highly influential in New South Wales: Sir Alfred Stephen was his uncle and Sir Henry Stephen, Montagu Stephen and Septimus Stephen were all cousins. In 1885 Harold Stephen was elected to the New South Wales Legislative Assembly for Monaro. Defeated in 1887, he returned in 1889 but died nine months later in Newtown.

References

1841 births
1889 deaths
Members of the New South Wales Legislative Assembly
Protectionist Party politicians
19th-century Australian politicians